Sharla Louise Passariello (born 14 January 1992) is a footballer who plays for the Welsh national team and UMF Selfoss. Passariello plays as a striker and came through the youth system at Bristol Academy.

Club career
Passariello played for Mardy FC while attending King Henry VIII School Abergavenny. She then helped Filton College win seven national titles and also featured for the Bristol Academy senior team in the FA Women's Premier League National Division.

She won a scholarship to the University of South Florida in 2010. In 2015 Passariello was resigned by Bristol. In 2016 Passariello signed for UMF Selfoss for the second half of the season, competing in the Icelandic Women's Pepsi League.

International career
Passariello played for Wales U17s aged just 14 and also became a regular with the U19s. She made her senior debut, aged 17, in a 3–0 win over Slovenia in August 2009.

References

External links
Sharla Passariello at UEFA
Sharla Passariello at FAW

1992 births
Living people
Bristol Academy W.F.C. players
Wales women's international footballers
FA Women's National League players
Women's Super League players
Welsh women's footballers
Sharla Passariello
South Florida Bulls women's soccer players
Women's association football forwards